Morrisonville is an unincorporated community in northern Loudoun County, Virginia. It is located on Morrisonville Road (Virginia Secondary Route 693).  It is notable as being the birthplace of the Pulitzer Prize winning author Russell Baker.

Unincorporated communities in Loudoun County, Virginia
Washington metropolitan area
Unincorporated communities in Virginia